The following is a list of indoor arenas in Mexico with a capacity of at least 3,000 spectators. 
Most of the arenas in this list have multiple uses such as individual sports, team sports as well as cultural events and political events. The arenas in the table are ranked by capacity; the arenas with the highest capacities are listed first.

Current arenas

Under construction

Former / demolished

See also
List of indoor arenas
List of stadiums in Mexico
List of football stadiums in Mexico

References

Indoor arenas in Mexico
 
Mexico
Indoor arenas
Mexico